Alfred Francis was a rugby player.

Alfred or Alf Francis may also refer to:

Alf Francis, motor racing mechanic
Alf Francis (ice hockey) in MJHL All-Star Teams

See also